Sanapur is a village in Gangavathi taluk, Koppal district in Karnataka, India. It has a population of 1628 according to 2011 census. A lake in the village fed by Tungabhadra Dam canal is a tourist attraction.

References 

Villages in Koppal district